Island Cruises was a cruise line that was founded as a joint venture between Royal Caribbean Cruises Ltd. and First Choice Travel PLC, each of whom owned 50% of the company. The company operated in Europe, the Caribbean, and South America, aiming its products primarily at markets in the United Kingdom, Brazil and Argentina. First Choice was later acquired by TUI Travel. In 2008, Royal Caribbean sold its stake in the company to TUI, and the cruise line's only fully owned ship, the Island Escape, was transferred to TUI's Thomson Cruises. Island Cruises was discontinued in 2015.

History

Island Cruises was founded in 2001 by Royal Caribbean and First Choice Holidays PLC, and began operations in 2002 with one ship, the Island Escape. Initially, Island Cruises had planned to operate in Europe during the summer season (Northern Hemisphere), and out of California during the winter. Before the first winter season began however, the decision was made to change the winter schedule to 3- and 4-night cruises out of Brazil. During 2002, the Island Escape was featured in the reality television series Cruise Ship, commissioned by ITV. Island Cruises targeted the British family market, offering casual "totally relaxed" cruising. In South America, the company targeted a younger audience.

On 6 October 2008 Royal Caribbean Cruises Ltd. sold their share in Island Cruises to TUI Travel PLC, who had acquired First Choice Holidays PLC. At the same time the Royal Caribbean announced they would be ending the charter of Island Star to Island Cruises in April 2009.

Sailings on the Island Star after April 2009 have been cancelled, and the ship will be re-deployed to Pullmantur Cruises, another subsidiary of Royal Caribbean Cruises Ltd as the MV Pacific Dream. Sailings on the Island Escape are unaffected, but are now being sold under TUI's existing Thomson Cruises brand.

The brand is still used today, in which Thomson markets the Island Escape as a part of Thomson Cruises's all-inclusive cruises under the Island Cruises name.

In October 2015, the Island Cruise brand was discontinued after the sole ship Island Escape completed her last scheduled cruise with Thomson Cruises.

Former Ships

References

External links

 Island Cruises international website
 Island Cruises Brazilian website

Royal Caribbean Group
Defunct cruise lines
Transport companies established in 2001
Transport companies disestablished in 2015